Georgi Dzhemalovich Melkadze (born 4 April 1997) is a Russian football player who plays as a second striker or centre-forward for PFC Sochi. He played mostly as a left winger earlier in his career.

Club career
He made his debut in the Russian Professional Football League for FC Spartak-2 Moscow on 23 September 2014 in a game against FC Znamya Truda Orekhovo-Zuyevo.

He made his Russian Premier League debut for FC Spartak Moscow on 17 May 2015 in a game against PFC CSKA Moscow.

On 5 June 2017, he joined the RPL newcomer FC Tosno on loan for the 2017–18 season.

On 29 May 2019, he extended his Spartak contract by 3 years.

On 2 September 2019, he joined FC Tambov on loan for the 2019–20 season.

On 14 August 2020, he was loaned to FC Akhmat Grozny for the 2020–21 season.

On 25 January 2022, he signed with PFC Sochi.

Career statistics

Honours

Club
Tosno
 Russian Cup: 2017–18

International
Russia U19
UEFA European Under-19 Championship: 2015 Runner-up

References

External links
 
 

1997 births
Russian sportspeople of Georgian descent
Footballers from Moscow
Living people
Russian footballers
Russia youth international footballers
Russia under-21 international footballers
Association football midfielders
FC Spartak-2 Moscow players
FC Spartak Moscow players
FC Tosno players
FC Tambov players
FC Akhmat Grozny players
PFC Sochi players
Russian Premier League players
Russian First League players
Russian Second League players